Abramkovo is a rural locality (a village) in Gorskoye Rural Settlement of Soletsky District, Novgorod Oblast, Russia. The population was 45 as of 2010. There is 1 street.

Geography 
The village is located on the right bank of the Shelon River, 33 km southwest of Soltsy (the district's administrative centre) by road. Petrovo is the nearest rural locality.

References 

Rural localities in Novgorod Oblast
Porkhovsky Uyezd